Everything Goes may refer to:

 Everything Goes!!!, a 1960 album by The Four Lads
 Everything Goes (Canadian TV series), a 1974 Canadian variety television series
 Everything Goes (game show), a 1980s American television game show
 Everything Goes (film), a 2004 Australian short film

See also 
 Everything Goes Cold
 Everything Goes Numb
 Everything Goes Wrong